The 1990 Irish presidential election was the tenth presidential election to be held in Ireland, the fifth to be contested by more than one candidate, and the first to have a female candidate and winner. It was held on Wednesday, 7 November 1990.

Nomination procedure
Under Article 12 of the Constitution of Ireland, a candidate for president could be nominated by:
at least twenty of the 226 serving members of the Houses of the Oireachtas, or
at least four of 31 county councils or county boroughs, or
a former or retiring president, on their own nomination.

The outgoing president, Patrick Hillery, had served the maximum of two terms, and no other former president was living.

Candidates

Brian Lenihan
Brian Lenihan, the Tánaiste and Minister for Defence was chosen by Fianna Fáil as their candidate, though he faced a late challenge for the party nomination from another senior minister, John Wilson. Lenihan was popular and widely seen as humorous and intelligent. He had delivered liberal policy reform, for example relaxed censorship in the 1960s.

Austin Currie
Fine Gael, after trying and failing to get former Taoiseach Garret FitzGerald and former Tánaiste Peter Barry to run, ultimately nominated the former Northern Ireland civil rights campaigner and SDLP member Austin Currie. Currie had been elected to the Dáil in the 1989 general election and had been a minister in Brian Faulkner's power-sharing executive in Northern Ireland from 1973 to 1974. However Currie had little experience in the politics of the Republic.

Mary Robinson
The Labour Party, along with the Workers' Party, nominated Mary Robinson, SC, a former Labour Party member and liberal campaigner who had served as a senator for Dublin University from 1969 to 1987. Robinson was a former Reid Professor of Law in the Trinity College Dublin and had been involved in the Campaign for Homosexual Law Reform and the campaign to save Wood Quay.

Campaign
Lenihan entered the race as odds-on favourite; no Fianna Fáil candidate had ever lost a presidential election. However Lenihan was derailed when he confirmed in an on-the-record interview with freelance journalist and academic researcher Jim Duffy that he had been involved in controversial attempts to pressurise President Patrick Hillery not to dissolve the Dáil in 1982. After the contrast between his public denials during the campaign and his eventual confirmation of his role during his earlier interview recorded in May the Progressive Democrats, then in coalition with Fianna Fáil, threatened to support an opposition motion of no confidence unless Lenihan was dismissed from the government or an inquiry into the 1982 events was set up. The incident caused Lenihan's support to drop from 43 to 32% with Robinson going from 38 to 51% Taoiseach Charles Haughey privately asked Lenihan to resign, and sacked him on 31 October—a week before the election—when he refused to do so leading to a sympathy vote for Lenihan; his support in the polls going from 32% on 29 October to 42% on 3 November (with Robinson's support dropping from 51 to 42%)).

At this point cabinet minister Pádraig Flynn launched a personal attack on Mary Robinson, accusing her as "having a new-found interest in her family", an attack that was itself attacked in response as "disgraceful" on live radio by Michael McDowell, a senior member of the Progressive Democrats, which up to that point had supported Lenihan's campaign. Flynn's attack was a fatal blow to Lenihan's campaign, causing many female supporters of Lenihan to vote for Robinson in a gesture of support.

Lenihan received a plurality of first preference votes. Robinson received more than twice as many votes as Currie, and 76.73% of Currie's votes transferred to Robinson, beating Lenihan into second place and electing Robinson as Ireland's first female president.

Result

Results by constituency

References

1990 elections in the Republic of Ireland
1990 in Irish politics
Presidential elections in Ireland
November 1990 events in Europe